South End Historic District may refer to:

South End District, Boston, Massachusetts, a historic district listed on the National Register of Historic Places (NRHP)
South End Historic District (Bristol, Connecticut), listed on the NRHP in Hartford County, Connecticut
South End Historic District (Stamford, Connecticut), listed on the NRHP in Fairfield County, Connecticut 
South End-Groesbeckville Historic District, Albany, New York, listed on the NRHP in New York